The 1937 Ontario general election was held on October 6, 1937, to elect the 90 Members of the 20th Legislative Assembly of Ontario ("MLAs"). It was the 20th general election held in the Province of Ontario.

The Ontario Liberal Party, led by Mitchell Hepburn, was re-elected for a second term in government, with a slightly reduced majority in the Legislature.

The Ontario Conservative Party, led by William Earl Rowe, was able to win six additional seats, and continued to form the official opposition.

Meanwhile, the fledgling democratic socialist Co-operative Commonwealth Federation (CCF) ran 37 candidates out of a possible 90, led by party president John Mitchell running in Waterloo South, who also campaigned throughout the province on the party's behalf. The election, however, resulted in a modest decline in popular vote and the loss of the party's sole MLA, Sam Lawrence in Hamilton East.

Incumbent MLA Farquhar Oliver was the last remaining United Farmers of Ontario MLA and ran as the party's sole candidate in the election. In practice, however, he had been a supporter of the Liberal government and would join Hepburn's cabinet in 1940, formally joining the Liberal Party.

In 1938, MLAs voted to adopt the title "Member of Provincial Parliament", and became known as "MPPs".

This Ontario election was the last to date in which the winning party (together with effective support from the Progressives and UFO, against which they did not field opposing candidates) has won an absolute majority of the popular vote.

Results

|-
! colspan=2 rowspan=2 | Political party
! rowspan=2 | Party leader
! colspan=5 | MPPs
! colspan=3 | Votes
|-
! Candidates
!1934
!Dissol.
!1937
!±
!#
!%
! ± (pp)

|style="text-align:left;"|Mitchell Hepburn
|86
|65
|66
|63
|2
|777,579
|49.49%
|2.40

|style="text-align:left;"|William Earl Rowe
|89
|17
|17
|23
|6
|619,599
|39.44%
|0.33

|style="text-align:left;"|
|3
|4
|4
|2
|2
|16,920
|1.08%
|1.36

|style="text-align:left;"|
|8
|–
|–
|1
|1
|20,776
|1.32%
|0.49

|style="text-align:left;"|Farquhar Oliver
|1
|1
|1
|1
|
|7,296
|0.46%
|0.09

|style="text-align:left;"|John Mitchell(party president)
|39
|1
|1
|–
|1
|83,579
|5.32%
|1.66

|
|6
|1
|–
|–
|1
|5,549
|0.35%
|0.06

|style="text-align:left;"|
|8
|1
|1
|–
|1
|4,108
|0.26%
|0.86

|style="text-align:left;"|
|6
|–
|–
|–
|
|14,675
|0.93%
|0.89

|style="text-align:left;"|
|2
|–
|–
|–
|
|9,626
|0.61%
|

|style="text-align:left;"|
|5
|–
|–
|–
|
|8,270
|0.53%
|0.51

|style="text-align:left;"|Socialist-Labour
|style="text-align:left;"|
|11
|–
|–
|–
|
|2,199
|0.14%
|0.04

|style="text-align:left;"|
|1
|–
|–
|–
|
|538
|0.03%
|

|style="text-align:left;"|
|1
|–
|–
|–
|
|408
|0.03%
|0.45

|style="text-align:left;"|Workers
|style="text-align:left;"|
|–
|–
|–
|–
|
|colspan="3"|Did not campaign

|colspan="3"|
|
|colspan="5"|
|-style="background:#E9E9E9;"
|colspan="3" style="text-align:left;"|Total
|266
|90
|90
|90
|
|1,571,122
|100.00%
|
|-
|colspan="8" style="text-align:left;"|Blank and invalid ballots
|align="right"|16,799
|style="background:#E9E9E9;" colspan="2"|
|-style="background:#E9E9E9;"
|colspan="8" style="text-align:left;"|Registered voters / turnout
|2,237,678
|70.96%
|4.28
|}

Seats that changed hands

There were 17 seats that changed allegiance in the election.

 Liberal to Conservative
Dufferin—Simcoe
Fort William
Hastings West
Leeds
Peel
Prince Edward—Lennox
Riverdale
Simcoe East
Victoria

 Conservative to Liberal
Bracondale
Peterborough
St. David

 Liberal-Progressive to Liberal
Brant
Muskoka—Ontario

 CCF to Liberal
Hamilton East

 Labour to Liberal
Kenora

 Independent to Independent-Liberal
Brantford

See also
Politics of Ontario
List of Ontario political parties
Premier of Ontario
Leader of the Opposition (Ontario)

Notes

References

Further reading
 

1937 elections in Canada
1937
1937 in Ontario
November 1937 events